Note that this article provides historical figures only for selected papers only with very few updates since 2018.  Newspapers such Guardian Australia, Crikey and The Saturday Paper are not listed. 

There are several measures of circulation of newspapers. The Australian Bureau of Circulations (ABC) Paid Media Audit Data provides independent verification of paid media distribution in Australia. Measures are also divided by electronic and print versions. The trend shown over the years is continuously declining for the print newspapers and surging for electronic newspapers since the 21st century.

Circulation of print newspapers 
Circulation of print newspapers is typically divided into Monday–Friday, Saturday/weekend and Sunday for each quarter. In 2017 the Audited Media Association of Australia announced that circulation figures were to be published every six months. The Herald Sun has the highest circulation in Australia. Based in one of the country's two major cities, Melbourne, it is the result of the amalgamation of the original Sun and Herald newspapers.

Circulation of digital newspapers 
For the quarterly reporting period of the ABC data, from March to June 2016, Fairfax made the decision to remove its digital circulation numbers because it believes the figures, released by the Audited Media Association of Australia (AMAA), wrongfully suggest subscriptions at The Sydney Morning Herald and The Age are falling. In October 2017, The Australian owned by News Corp, claimed to be the first newspaper in Australia achieving over 100,000 paying online subscribers.

Circulation of local/community newspapers 
Local/Community newspapers tend to be distributed free of charge to a given community/area. A measure of paid print copies has no meaning in this circumstance. Readership tends to be measured by the number of copies distributed. Below are the distribution numbers for the quarter ending December 2016.

Top 25 newspapers in Australia in early 2010 

This is a list of the top 25 newspapers in the Australia by  Monday–Friday or Monday–Saturday circulation for the three-month period ending 30 June 2010. These figures were released by The Newspaper Works, a trade organization.

See also 

Lists of newspapers
List of newspapers in Australia
Newspaper circulation
Newspapers in Australia
List of newspapers by circulation

References

Sources 

 http://www.presscouncil.org.au/uploads/52321/state-of-the-news-print-media-2008.pdf
 https://mumbrella.com.au/afr-circulation-falls-while-famous-enjoys-35-boost-11721
 https://mumbrella.com.au/why-you-might-not-want-to-book-newspaper-ads-in-melbourne-for-tuesdays-64601
 https://web.archive.org/web/20110722033436/http://media.crikey.com.au/wp-content/uploads/2010/11/circulation.pdf
 https://web.archive.org/web/20131208053344/http://www.adnews.com.au/files/dmfile/ABCNEWS.pdf (Sep qtr, 2013)
 https://mumbrella.com.au/abcs-australian-slides-100000-copies-first-time-389108
 https://mumbrella.com.au/abcs-newspapers-march-2016-australian-afr-fairfax-news-366400
 https://mumbrella.com.au/abcs-age-sees-digital-subscriptions-slide-australian-nearly-doubles-afr-print-sales-345756
 https://mumbrella.com.au/abcs-newspapers-3-188553
 http://www.adnews.com.au/abc-the-austrian-sees-increase#l56PBIotCwB1O07d.99
 http://www.adnews.com.au/news/abc-figures-newspaper-sales-continue-to-fall-but-can-digital-save-the-day
 https://mumbrella.com.au/abcs-fairfax-medias-weekly-titles-continue-decline-australian-grows-digital-subscribers-407573

Australia
Circulation